TSV Aindling is a German football club from the city of Aindling, Bavaria. It is part of a larger sports club that also has departments for women's and children's gymnastics, ice stock, skiing, tennis, and volleyball.



History
The club was founded in 1946 as Turn- und Sportverein Aindling-Todtenweis and in 1956 merged with TSV Pichl.

The clubs first rose out of regional Schwaben football in 1982 when they won the Bezirksliga Schwaben-Nord and were promoted to the Landesliga Bayern-Süd (V) where they made an immediate impact with a second-place finish. They took part in a promotion round for the Bayernliga (IV) but failed to advance. Their second season in the league was almost as successful, finishing third, but, after this, the team declined and in 1989, it was relegated to the Bezirksoberliga Schwaben (V).

The club again gained promotion from the Bezirksoberliga to the Landesliga Bayern-Süd (V) in 1992 on the strength of a second-place finish. A second-place result at that level in 1996 then earned the team promotion to the Fußball-Bayernliga (IV) where they established themselves firmly as a mid-table side.

The 2008–09 season became the club's most successful to-date, finishing runners-up in the Bayernliga.

TSV qualified for play in the DFB-Pokal (German Cup) in 2003 and 2004, but went out early on both occasions against Bundesliga sides. In 2003, they won the Bavarian Cup with a 14–0 victory over TSV Gerbrunn and made a losing appearance in the next year's final versus SSV Jahn Regensburg II.

The club made negative headlines in 2011 when it, club officials and current and former players were raided by the German customs department in December 2011. Aindling was thought to have knowingly withheld social security payments. Consequently, the club declined to apply for a licence for the new Regionalliga Bayern but retained its place in the Bayernliga, entering the southern division of the newly divided league from 2012.

The club's 17 season long stay in the Bayernliga came to an end in 2013 when it finished on a relegation play-off rank and lost to DJK Vilzing on away goal rule after drawing nil-all away and one-all at home. The following Landesliga season proved difficult for the club, too, only retaining its league membership through success in the relegation round.

Shortly after the start of the 2014–15 season it was announced that the club had illegally withheld €2.1million in tax and social security payments between 2003 and 2011 by not declaring income and player wages. Four former and current officials were charged by the state prosecuted in Augsburg. The amount of money involved in the case is unusually high for a club formerly at Bayernliga level, a tier five league.

In August 2015, the club declared insolvency but continued to play in the Landesliga.

The club's reserve team, the TSV Aindling II has been playing in the Bezirksliga Schwaben-Nord from 2003 to 2012 when it was relegated to the Kreisliga.

Honours
The club's honours:

League
 Bayernliga (V)
 Runners-up: 2009
 Landesliga Bayern-Süd (IV-V)
 Runners-up: 1983, 1996
 Bezirksoberliga Schwaben (V)
 Runners-up: 1992
 Bezirksliga Schwaben-Nord (V)
 Champions: 1982

Cup
 Bavarian Cup
 Winners: 2003
 Runners-up: 2004
 Schwaben Cup
 Winners: (5) 1984, 1995, 1997, 2003, 2009
 Runners-up: (3) 1981, 1985, 2004

Recent managers
Recent managers of the club:

TSV Aindling seasons
The recent season-by-season performance of the club:

TSV Aindling

TSV Aindling II

With the introduction of the Bezirksoberligas in 1988 as the new fifth tier, below the Landesligas, all leagues below dropped one tier. With the introduction of the Regionalligas in 1994 and the 3. Liga in 2008 as the new third tier, below the 2. Bundesliga, all leagues below dropped one tier. With the establishment of the Regionalliga Bayern as the new fourth tier in Bavaria in 2012 the Bayernliga was split into a northern and a southern division, the number of Landesligas expanded from three to five and the Bezirksoberligas abolished. All leagues from the Bezirksligas onwards were elevated one tier.

DFB-Pokal appearances
The club has qualified for the first round of the German Cup two times:

Source:

References

Sources
Grüne, Hardy (2001). Vereinslexikon. Kassel: AGON Sportverlag

External links
 Official team site  
 TSV Aindling profile at Weltfussball.de  
 Das deutsche Fußball-Archiv  historical German domestic league tables
 TSV Aindling profile at FuPa.net 

Association football clubs established in 1946
Football clubs in Germany
Football clubs in Bavaria
Football in Swabia (Bavaria)
1946 establishments in Germany